

Events

Pre-1600
 395 – Later Yan is defeated by its former vassal Northern Wei at the Battle of Canhe Slope.
757 – The poet Du Fu returns to Chang'an as a member of Emperor Xuanzong's court, after having escaped the city during the An Lushan Rebellion.
 877 – Louis the Stammerer (son of Charles the Bald) is crowned king of the West Frankish Kingdom at Compiègne.
1504 – Ahmad ibn Abi Jum'ah writes his Oran fatwa, arguing for the relaxation of Islamic law requirements for the forcibly converted Muslims in Spain.

1601–1900
1660 – A woman (either Margaret Hughes or Anne Marshall) appears on an English public stage for the first time, in the role of Desdemona in a production of Shakespeare's play Othello.
1851 – Conservative Santiago-based government troops defeat rebels at the Battle of Loncomilla, signaling the end of the 1851 Chilean Revolution.
1854 – In his Apostolic constitution Ineffabilis Deus, Pope Pius IX proclaims the dogmatic definition of Immaculate Conception, which holds that the Blessed Virgin Mary was conceived free of Original Sin.
1864 – Pope Pius IX promulgates the encyclical Quanta cura and its appendix, the Syllabus of Errors, outlining the authority of the Catholic Church and condemning various liberal ideas.

1901–present
1907 – King Gustaf V of Sweden accedes to the Swedish throne.
1912 – Leaders of the German Empire hold an Imperial War Council to discuss the possibility that war might break out.
1914 – World War I: A squadron of Britain's Royal Navy defeats the Imperial German East Asia Squadron in the Battle of the Falkland Islands in the South Atlantic.
1922 – Two days after coming into existence, the Irish Free State executes four leaders of the Irish Republican Army.
1941 – World War II: U.S. President Franklin D. Roosevelt declares December 7 to be "a date which will live in infamy", after which the U.S. declares war on Japan.
  1941   – World War II: Japanese forces simultaneously invade Shanghai International Settlement, Malaya, Thailand, Hong Kong, the Philippines, and the Dutch East Indies. (See December 7 for the concurrent attack on Pearl Harbor in the Western Hemisphere.)
1943 – World War II: The German 117th Jäger Division destroys the monastery of Mega Spilaio in Greece and executes 22 monks and visitors as part of reprisals that culminated a few days later with the Massacre of Kalavryta.
1953 – U.S. President Dwight D. Eisenhower delivers his "Atoms for Peace" speech, which leads to an American program to supply equipment and information on nuclear power to schools, hospitals, and research institutions around the world.
1955 – The Flag of Europe is adopted by Council of Europe.
1962 – Workers at four New York City newspapers (this later increases to nine) go on strike for 114 days.
1963 – Pan Am Flight 214, a Boeing 707, is struck by lightning and crashes near Elkton, Maryland, killing all 81 people on board.
1966 – The Greek ship  sinks in a storm in the Aegean Sea, killing over 200.
1969 – Olympic Airways Flight 954 strikes a mountain outside of Keratea, Greece, killing 90 people in the worst crash of a Douglas DC-6 in history.
1971 – Indo-Pakistani War: The Indian Navy launches an attack on West Pakistan's port city of Karachi.
1972 – United Airlines Flight 553, a Boeing 737, crashes after aborting its landing attempt at Chicago Midway International Airport, killing 45. This is the first-ever loss of a Boeing 737.
1974 – A plebiscite results in the abolition of monarchy in Greece.
1980 – John Lennon is murdered by Mark David Chapman in front of The Dakota in New York City. 
1985 – The South Asian Association for Regional Cooperation, the regional intergovernmental organization and geopolitical union in South Asia, is established.
1987 – Cold War: The Intermediate-Range Nuclear Forces Treaty is signed by U.S. President Ronald Reagan and Soviet leader Mikhail Gorbachev in the White House.
  1987   – An Israeli army tank transporter kills four Palestinian refugees and injures seven others during a traffic accident at the Erez Crossing on the Israel–Gaza Strip border, which has been cited as one of the events which sparked the First Intifada.
1988 – A United States Air Force A-10 Thunderbolt II crashes into an apartment complex in Remscheid, Germany, killing five people and injuring 50 others.
1990 – The Galileo spacecraft flies past Earth for the first time.
1991 – The leaders of Russia, Belarus and Ukraine sign an agreement dissolving the Soviet Union and establishing the Commonwealth of Independent States.
1992 – The Galileo spacecraft flies past Earth for the second time.
1998 – Eighty-one people are killed by armed groups in Algeria.
2001 – A raid conducted by the Internal Security Department (ISD) of Singapore foils a Jemaah Islamiyah (JI) plot to bomb foreign embassies in Singapore.
2004 – The Cusco Declaration is signed in Cusco, Peru, establishing the South American Community of Nations.
  2004   – Columbus nightclub shooting: Nathan Gale opens fire at the Alrosa Villa nightclub in Columbus, Ohio, killing former Pantera guitarist Dimebag Darrell and three others before being shot dead by a police officer. 
2009 – Bombings in Baghdad, Iraq, kill 127 people and injure 448 others.
2010 – With the second launch of the Falcon 9 and the first launch of the Dragon, SpaceX becomes the first private company to successfully launch, orbit and recover a spacecraft.
  2010   – The Japanese solar-sail spacecraft IKAROS passes the planet Venus at a distance of about 80,800 km.
2013 – Riots break out in Singapore after a fatal accident in Little India.
  2013   – Metallica performs a show in Antarctica, making them the first band to perform on all seven continents.
2019 – First confirmed case of COVID-19 in China.

Births

Pre-1600
65 BC – Horace, Roman poet (d. 8 BC)
1021 – Wang Anshi, Chinese economist and chancellor (d. 1086)
1412 – Astorre II Manfredi, Italian lord (d. 1468)
1418 – Queen Jeonghui, Queen consort of Korea (d. 1483)
1424 – Anselm Adornes, Belgian merchant, politician and diplomat (d. 1483)
1538 – Miklós Istvánffy, Hungarian politician (d. 1615)
1542 – Mary, Queen of Scots, daughter of James V of Scotland and Mary of Guise (d. 1587)
1558 – François de La Rochefoucauld, Catholic cardinal (d. 1645)

1601–1900
1678 – Antonio de Benavides, colonial governor of Florida (d. 1762) 
  1678   – Horatio Walpole, 1st Baron Walpole, English politician and diplomat, British Ambassador to France (d. 1757)
1699 – Maria Josepha of Austria (d. 1757)
1708 – Francis I, Holy Roman Emperor (d. 1765)
1724 – Claude Balbastre, French organist and composer (d. 1799)
1730 – Jan Ingenhousz, Dutch physician, physiologist, and botanist (d. 1799)
1731 – František Xaver Dušek, Czech pianist and composer (d. 1799)
1756 – Archduke Maximilian Francis of Austria (d. 1801)
1765 – Eli Whitney, American engineer, invented the cotton gin (d. 1825)
1795 – Peter Andreas Hansen, Danish astronomer and mathematician (d. 1874)
1807 – Friedrich Traugott Kützing, German pharmacist, botanist and phycologist (d. 1893)
1813 – August Belmont, Prussian-American financier and diplomat, 16th United States Ambassador to the Netherlands (d. 1890)
1815 – Adolph Menzel, German painter and illustrator (d. 1905)
1817 – Christian Emil Krag-Juel-Vind-Frijs, Danish lawyer and politician, 10th Prime Minister of Denmark (d. 1896)
1818 – Charles III, Prince of Monaco (d. 1889)
1822 – Jakov Ignjatović, Hungarian-Serbian author (d. 1889)
1832 – Bjørnstjerne Bjørnson, Norwegian-French author and playwright, Nobel Prize laureate (d. 1910)
1860 – Amanda McKittrick Ros, Irish author and poet (d. 1939)
1861 – William C. Durant, American businessman, founded General Motors and Chevrolet (d. 1947)
  1861   – Aristide Maillol, French sculptor and painter (d. 1944)
  1861   – Georges Méliès, French actor, director, producer, and screenwriter (d. 1938)
1862 – Georges Feydeau, French playwright (d. 1921)
1863 – Charles Lincoln Edwards, American zoologist (d. 1937)
1864 – Camille Claudel, French illustrator and sculptor (d. 1943)
1865 – Rüdiger von der Goltz, German general (d. 1946)
  1865   – Jacques Hadamard, French mathematician and academic (d. 1963)
  1865   – Jean Sibelius, Finnish violinist and composer (d. 1957)
1874 – Ernst Moro, Austrian physician and pediatrician (d. 1951)
1875 – Frederik Buch, Danish actor and screenwriter (d. 1925)
1877 – Paul Ladmirault, French pianist, violinist, and composer (d. 1944)
1880 – Johannes Aavik, Estonian linguist and philologist (d. 1973)
1881 – Albert Gleizes, French painter (d. 1953)
1884 – Francis Balfour, English colonel and politician (d. 1965)
1886 – Diego Rivera, Mexican painter and educator (d. 1957)
1890 – Bohuslav Martinů, Czech-American pianist and composer (d. 1959)
1892 – Marcus Lee Hansen, American historian, author, and academic (d. 1938)
1894 – E. C. Segar, American cartoonist, created Popeye (d. 1938)
  1894   – James Thurber, American humorist and cartoonist (d. 1961)
1899 – Arthur Leslie, English-Welsh actor and playwright (d. 1970)
  1899   – John Qualen, Canadian-American actor (d. 1987)
1900 – Sun Li-jen, Chinese general and politician (d. 1990)
  1900   – Ants Oras, Estonian-American author and academic (d. 1982)

1901–present
1902 – Wifredo Lam, Cuban-French painter (d. 1982)
1903 – Zelma Watson George, Black American opera singer (d. 1994)
1908 – Concha Piquer, Spanish singer and actress (d. 1990) 
  1908   – John A. Volpe, American soldier and politician, 61st Governor of Massachusetts (d. 1994)
1911 – Lee J. Cobb, American actor (d. 1976)
  1911   – Nikos Gatsos, Greek poet and songwriter (d. 1992)
1913 – Delmore Schwartz, American poet and short story writer (d. 1966)
1914 – Floyd Tillman, American country music singer-songwriter and guitarist (d. 2003)
  1914   – Ernie Toshack, Australian cricketer (d. 2003)
1915 – Ernest Lehman, American director, producer, and screenwriter (d. 2005)
1916 – Richard Fleischer, American director, producer, and screenwriter (d. 2006)
1917 – Ian Johnson, Australian cricketer and administrator (d. 1998)
1919 – Peter Tali Coleman, Samoan-American lawyer and politician, 43rd Governor of American Samoa (d. 1997)
  1919   – Julia Bowman, American mathematician and theorist (d. 1985)
  1919   – Kateryna Yushchenko, Ukrainian computer scientist and academic (d. 2001)
1920 – McDonald Bailey, Trinidadian-English sprinter and rugby player (d. 2013)
1922 – Lucian Freud, German-English painter and illustrator (d. 2011)
  1922   – Jean Ritchie, American singer-songwriter (d. 2015)
1923 – Dewey Martin, American actor (d. 2018)
  1923   – Rudolph Pariser, Chinese-American soldier and chemist
1924 – Lionel Gilbert, Australian historian, author, and academic (d. 2015)
1925 – Sammy Davis, Jr., American actor, singer, and dancer (d. 1990)
  1925   – Nasir Kazmi, Pakistani Urdu poet (d. 1972)
  1925   – Carmen Martín Gaite, Spanish author and poet (d. 2000)
  1925   – Jimmy Smith, American organist (d. 2005)
1927 – Vladimir Shatalov, Kazakhstani general, pilot, and astronaut (d. 2021)
  1927   – Niklas Luhmann, German thinker and social theorist (d. 1998)
1928 – Bill Hewitt, Canadian journalist and sportscaster (d. 1996)
  1928   – Ulric Neisser, German-American psychologist, neuroscientist, and academic (d. 2012)
1930 – Julian Critchley, English journalist and politician (d. 2000)
  1930   – Maximilian Schell, Austrian-Swiss actor, director, producer, and screenwriter (d. 2014)
1931 – Bob Arum, American boxing promoter, founded Top Rank
1933 – Flip Wilson, American actor and comedian (d. 1998)
1935 – Dharmendra, Indian actor, producer, and politician
  1935   – Tatiana Zatulovskaya, Russian-Israeli chess player (d. 2017)
1936 – David Carradine, American actor, director, and producer (d. 2009)
  1936   – Michael Hobson, American publisher
  1936   – Peter Parfitt, English cricketer 
1937 – James MacArthur, American actor (d. 2010)
  1937   – Arne Næss, Jr., German-Norwegian mountaineer and businessman (d. 2004)
1939 – Red Berenson, Canadian ice hockey player and coach
  1939   – Jerry Butler, American singer-songwriter and producer
  1939   – James Galway, Irish flute player
  1939   – Felipe Gozon, Filipino lawyer and businessman
  1939   – Dariush Mehrjui, Iranian director, producer, and screenwriter
  1939   – Soko Richardson, American drummer (d. 2004)
1940 – Brant Alyea, American baseball player
1941 – Ed Brinkman, American baseball player and coach (d. 2008)
  1941   – Bob Brown, American football player
  1941   – Duke Cunningham, American commander and politician
  1941   – Bobby Elliott, English drummer 
  1941   – Geoff Hurst, English footballer and manager
1943 – Larry Martin, American paleontologist and ornithologist (d. 2013)
  1943   – Jim Morrison, American singer-songwriter and poet (d. 1971)
  1943   – James Tate, American poet (d. 2015)
  1943   – Bodo Tümmler, German runner
  1943   – Mary Woronov, American actress, director, and screenwriter
1944 – George Baker, Dutch singer-songwriter
  1944   – Bertie Higgins, American singer-songwriter
  1944   – Ted Irvine, Canadian ice hockey player
  1944   – Vince MacLean, Canadian educator and politician
1945 – John Banville, Irish novelist and screenwriter
  1945   – Julie Heldman, American tennis player 
1946 – John Rubinstein, American actor, director, and composer
  1946   – Chava Alberstein, Polish-Israeli singer-songwriter and guitarist
1947 – Gregg Allman, American musician (d. 2017)
  1947   – Gérard Blanc, French singer, guitarist, and actor (d. 2009)
  1947   – Thomas Cech, American chemist and academic, Nobel Prize laureate
  1947   – Kati-Claudia Fofonoff, Finnish author and poet (d. 2011)
  1947   – Margaret Geller, American astrophysicist, astronomer, and academic
1948 – Luis Caffarelli, Argentinian-American mathematician and academic
  1948   – John Waters, English-Australian actor, singer-songwriter, and guitarist
1949 – Mary Gordon, American author, critic, and academic
  1949   – Nancy Meyers, American director, producer, and screenwriter
  1949   – Robert Sternberg, American psychologist and academic
1950 – Rick Baker, American actor and makeup artist
  1950   – Tim Foli, American baseball player, coach, and manager
  1950   – Dan Hartman, American singer-songwriter and producer  (d. 1994)
1951 – Bill Bryson, American essayist, travel and science writer
  1951   – Richard Desmond, English publisher and businessman, founded Northern & Shell
  1951   – Jan Eggum, Norwegian singer-songwriter and guitarist 
1952 – Khaw Boon Wan, Malayan-Singaporean politician, Singaporean Minister of Health
  1952   – Steve Atkinson, English-Hong Kong cricketer
1953 – Kim Basinger, American actress
  1953   – Roy Firestone, American sportscaster and journalist
  1953   – Norman Finkelstein, American author, academic, and activist
  1953   – Sam Kinison, American comedian (d. 1992)
  1953   – Władysław Kozakiewicz, Lithuanian-Polish pole vaulter and coach
  1953   – Steve Yates, English footballer
1954 – Harold Hongju Koh, American lawyer, academic, and politician
  1954   – Frits Pirard, Dutch cyclist
1955 – Milenko Zablaćanski, Serbian actor, director, and screenwriter (d. 2008)
1956 – Warren Cuccurullo, American singer-songwriter and guitarist
  1956   – Andrius Kubilius, Lithuanian academic and politician, 9th Prime Minister of Lithuania
  1956   – Slick, American wrestler and manager
1957 – Mike Buchanan, British men's rights advocate
  1957   – James Cama, American martial artist and educator (d. 2014)
  1957   – Phil Collen, English singer-songwriter and guitarist 
1958 – Rob Byrnes, American author and blogger
  1958   – Rob Curling, Malayan-English journalist
  1958   – Michel Ferté, French race car driver
  1958   – Bob Greene, American physiologist and author
  1958   – Mirosław Okoński, Polish footballer
  1958   – George Rogers, American football player
1959 – Stephen Jefferies, South African cricketer and coach
  1959   – Mark Steyn, Canadian-American author and critic
1960 – Aaron Allston, American game designer and author (d. 2014)
  1960   – Lim Guan Eng, Malaysian accountant and politician
1961 – Conceição Lima, São Toméan poet
  1961   – Mikey Robins, Australian comedian and television host
1962 – Steve Elkington, Australian-American golfer
  1962   – Marty Friedman, American-Japanese guitarist, songwriter, and television host 
  1962   – Nikos Karageorgiou, Greek footballer and manager
  1962   – Berry van Aerle, Dutch footballer
1963 – Greg Howe, American guitarist, songwriter, and producer
  1963   – Toshiaki Kawada, Japanese wrestler
  1963   – Ricky Walford, Australian rugby league player
1964 – James Blundell, Australian singer-songwriter and guitarist
  1964   – Teri Hatcher, American actress
  1964   – Chigusa Nagayo, Japanese wrestler
  1964   – Óscar Ramírez, Costa Rican footballer and coach
1965 – David Harewood, English actor
  1965   – Theo Maassen, Dutch actor, producer, and screenwriter
1966 – Bushwick Bill, Jamaican-American rapper (d. 2019)
  1966   – Les Ferdinand, English footballer and coach
  1966   – Tyler Mane, Canadian wrestler and actor
  1966   – Sinéad O'Connor, Irish singer-songwriter
1967 – Jeff George, American football player
  1967   – Andy Kapp, German curler
  1967   – Kotono Mitsuishi, Japanese voice actress and singer
  1967   – Darren Sheridan, English footballer and manager
1968 – Mike Mussina, American baseball player and coach
  1968   – Doriano Romboni, Italian motorcycle racer (d. 2013)
1969 – Kristin Lauter, American mathematician and cryptographer
1971 – Abdullah Ercan, Turkish footballer and manager
1972 – Indrek Allmann, Estonian architect
  1972   – Janae Marie Kroczaleski, American powerlifter
  1972   – Édson Ribeiro, Brazilian sprinter
1973 – Corey Taylor, American singer-songwriter, musician, and actor 
1974 – Cristian Castro, Mexican singer
  1974   – Tony Simmons, American football player and coach
  1974   – Nick Zinner, American guitarist, songwriter, and producer 
  1975   – Kevin Harvick, American race car driver
1976 – Brettina, Bahamian-American singer-songwriter and actress
  1976   – Reed Johnson, American baseball player
  1976   – Dominic Monaghan, German-born English actor
  1976   – Zoe Konstantopoulou, Greek lawyer and politician
1977 – Ryan Newman, American race car driver
  1977   – Aleksandra Olsza, Polish tennis player
  1977   – Anita Weyermann, Swiss runner and journalist
1978 – John Oster, English-Welsh footballer
  1978   – Frédéric Piquionne, French footballer
  1978   – Anwar Siraj, Ethiopian footballer
  1978   – Ian Somerhalder, American actor
  1978   – Vernon Wells, American baseball player
1979 – Daniel Fitzhenry, Australian rugby player
  1979   – Johan Forssell, Swedish lawyer and politician
  1979   – Raymond Lam, Chinese actor and singer
  1979   – Ingrid Michaelson, American singer-songwriter and pianist
  1979   – Christian Wilhelmsson, Swedish footballer
1980 – Yuliya Krevsun, Ukrainian runner
1981 – Jeremy Accardo, American baseball player
  1981   – Simon Finnigan, English rugby league player
  1981   – Philip Rivers, American football player
1982 – Alfredo Aceves, American baseball player
  1982   – Serena Ryder, Canadian singer-songwriter 
  1982   – Chrisette Michele, American singer-songwriter
  1982   – Nicki Minaj, Trinidadian-American rapper and actress
1983 – Neel Jani, Swiss race car driver
  1983   – Valéry Mézague, Cameroonian footballer (d. 2014)
1984 – Emma Green Tregaro, Swedish high jumper
  1984   – Greg Halford, English footballer
  1984   – Sam Hunt, American singer-songwriter
1985 – Josh Donaldson, American baseball player
  1985   – Meagan Duhamel, Canadian figure skater
  1985   – Dwight Howard, American basketball player
  1985   – Oleksiy Pecherov, Ukrainian basketball player
1986 – Enzo Amore, American wrestler and rapper
  1986   – Amir Khan, English boxer
  1986   – Sam Tagataese, New Zealand-Samoan rugby league player
  1986   – Kate Voegele, American singer-songwriter, guitarist, and actress
1989 – Drew Doughty, Canadian ice hockey player
  1989   – Jesse Sene-Lefao, New Zealand rugby league player
1992 – Yui Yokoyama, Japanese idol, model, and actress
1993 – Janari Jõesaar, Estonian basketball player
  1993   – Jordan Obita, English footballer
  1993   – AnnaSophia Robb, American actress 
  1993   – Cara Mund, Miss America 2018
1994 – Conseslus Kipruto, Kenyan runner
  1994   – Raheem Sterling, English footballer
1996 – Scott McTominay, Scottish footballer

Deaths

Pre-1600
 855 – Drogo of Metz, illegitimate son of Charlemagne (b. 801)
 899 – Arnulf of Carinthia (b. 850)
 964 – Zhou the Elder, Chinese queen consort
1186 – Berthold IV, Duke of Zähringen (b.c 1125)
1292 – John Peckham, Archbishop of Canterbury
1365 – Nicholas II, Duke of Opava (b. 1288)
1431 – Hedwig Jagiellon, Polish and Lithuanian princess (b. 1408)
1550 – Gian Giorgio Trissino, Italian humanist, poet, dramatist and diplomat (b. 1478)

1601–1900
1626 – John Davies, English poet, lawyer, and politician (b. 1569)
1632 – Philippe van Lansberge, Dutch astronomer and mathematician (b. 1561)
1638 – Ivan Gundulić, Croatian poet (b. 1589)
1643 – John Pym, English politician (b. 1583)
1649 – Noël Chabanel, French missionary and saint (b. 1613)
1680 – Henry Pierrepont, 1st Marquess of Dorchester, English lawyer and politician (b. 1606)
1691 – Richard Baxter, English minister, poet, and hymn-writer (b. 1615)
1695 – Barthélemy d'Herbelot, French orientalist and academic (b. 1625)
1709 – Thomas Corneille, French playwright and philologist (b. 1625)
1722 – Elizabeth Charlotte, Princess Palatine (b. 1652)
1734 – James Figg, English prizefighter
1744 – Marie Anne de Mailly, French mistress of Louis XV of France (b. 1717)
1745 – Étienne Fourmont, French orientalist and academic (b. 1683)
1746 – Charles Radclyffe, English courtier and soldier (b. 1693)
1756 – William Stanhope, 1st Earl of Harrington, English politician and diplomat, Lord Lieutenant of Ireland (b. 1690)
1768 – Jean Denis Attiret, French painter and missionary (b. 1702)
1779 – Nathan Alcock, English physician (b. 1707)
1815 – Mary Bosanquet Fletcher, Methodist preacher and philanthropist (b. 1739)
1830 – Benjamin Constant, Swiss-French philosopher and author (b. 1767)
1856 – Theobald Mathew, Irish social reformer and temperance movement leader (b. 1790)
1859 – Thomas De Quincey, English journalist and author (b. 1785)
1864 – George Boole, English mathematician and philosopher (b. 1815)
1869 – Narcisa de Jesús, Ecuadorian saint (b. 1832)
1885 – William Henry Vanderbilt, American businessman and philanthropist (b. 1821)
1886 – Isaac Lea, American conchologist, geologist, and publisher (b. 1792)
1894 – Pafnuty Chebyshev, Russian mathematician and theorist (b. 1821)

1901–present
1903 – Herbert Spencer, English biologist, anthropologist, sociologist, and philosopher (b. 1820)
1907 – King Oscar II of Sweden (b. 1829)
1913 – Camille Jenatzy, Belgian race car driver (b. 1868)
1914 – Melchior Anderegg, Swiss mountain guide (b. 1828)
  1914   – Maximilian von Spee, Danish-German admiral (b. 1861)
1917 – Mendele Mocher Sforim, Russian author (b. 1836)
1918 – Josip Stadler, Bosnian Catholic archbishop (b. 1843)
1919 – J. Alden Weir, American painter (b. 1852)
1922 – Joe McKelvey, Irish Republican Army officer executed during the Irish Civil War
1929 – José Vicente Concha, Colombian politician and 8th President of Colombia (b. 1867)
1932 – Gertrude Jekyll, British horticulturist and writer (b. 1843)
1937 – Hans Molisch, Czech-Austrian botanist and academic (b. 1856)
1938 – Friedrich Glauser, Swiss author (b. 1896)
1940 – George Lloyd, English-Canadian bishop and theologian (b. 1861)
1941 – Izidor Kürschner, Hungarian football player and coach (b. 1885)
1942 – Albert Kahn, American architect, Fisher Building, Packard Automotive Plant, Ford River Rouge Complex (b. 1869)
1952 – Charles Lightoller, English sailor (b. 1874)
1954 – Claude Cahun, French artist, photographer, and writer (b. 1894)
  1954   – Gladys George, American actress (b. 1904)
  1954   – Joseph B. Keenan, American lawyer and politician (b. 1888)
1958 – Tris Speaker, American baseball player and manager (b. 1888)
1963 – Sarit Thanarat, Thai field marshal and politician, 11th Prime Minister of Thailand (b. 1908)
1966 – Ward Morehouse, American playwright, author, and critic (b. 1899)
1971 – Ernst Krenkel, Russian geographer and explorer (b. 1903)
  1971   – Eleni Ourani, Greek poet and critic (b. 1896)
1975 – Gary Thain, New Zealand bass player (b. 1948)
1978 – Golda Meir, Ukrainian-Israeli educator and politician, 4th Prime Minister of Israel (b. 1898)
1980 – John Lennon, English singer-songwriter and guitarist  (b. 1940)
1982 – Bram Behr, Surinamese journalist and politician (b. 1951)
  1982   – André Kamperveen, Surinamese footballer and manager (b. 1924)
  1982   – Marty Robbins, American singer-songwriter and race car driver (b. 1925)
  1982   – Haim Laskov, Israel Defense Forces fifth Chief of Staff (b. 1919)
1983 – Keith Holyoake, New Zealand farmer and politician, 26th Prime Minister of New Zealand (b. 1904) 
  1983   – Slim Pickens, American actor (b. 1919)
1984 – Luther Adler, American actor (b. 1903)
  1984   – Robert Jay Mathews, American militant leader, founded The Order (b. 1953)
  1984   – Razzle, English drummer (b. 1960)
  1984   – Semih Sancar, Turkish general (b. 1911)
1991 – Buck Clayton, American trumpet player and composer (b. 1911)
1992 – William Shawn, American journalist (b. 1917)
1993 – Yevgeny Minayev, Russian weightlifter (b. 1933)
1994 – Antônio Carlos Jobim, Brazilian singer-songwriter and pianist (b. 1927)
1996 – Howard Rollins, American actor (b. 1950)
  1996   – Kashiwado Tsuyoshi, Japanese sumo wrestler, the 47th Yokozuna (b. 1938)
1997 – Bob Bell, American clown and actor (b. 1922)
1999 – Péter Kuczka, Hungarian poet and author (b. 1923)
2001 – Mirza Delibašić, Bosnian basketball player and coach (b. 1954)
  2001   – Betty Holberton, American computer scientist and programmer (b. 1917)
2003 – Rubén González, Cuban pianist (b. 1919)
2004 – Dimebag Darrell, American singer-songwriter and guitarist (b. 1966)
2005 – Rose Heilbron, British barrister and judge (b. 1914)
2006 – Martha Tilton, American singer (b. 1915)
  2006   – José Uribe, Dominican baseball player (b. 1959)
2007 – Gerardo García Pimentel, Mexican journalist (b. 1983)
2008 – Oliver Postgate, English voice actor, director, producer, and screenwriter (b. 1925)
  2008   – Robert Prosky, American actor (b. 1930)
2009 – Luis Días, Dominican singer-songwriter and guitarist (b. 1952)
2012 – Jerry Brown, American football player (b. 1987)
  2012   – John Gowans, Scottish-English 16th General of The Salvation Army (b. 1934)
  2012   – Johnny Lira, American boxer (b. 1951)
2013 – John Cornforth, Australian-English chemist and academic, Nobel Prize laureate (b. 1917)
  2013   – Sándor Szokolay, Hungarian composer and academic (b. 1931)
  2013   – Richard S. Williamson, American lawyer and diplomat (b. 1949)
2014 – Tom Gosnell, Canadian lawyer and politician (b. 1951)
  2014   – Russ Kemmerer, American baseball player and coach (b. 1930)
  2014   – Knut Nystedt, Norwegian organist and composer (b. 1915)
2015 – Mattiwilda Dobbs, American soprano and actress (b. 1925)
  2015   – Alan Hodgkinson, English footballer and coach (b. 1936)
  2015   – Douglas Tompkins, American businessman, co-founded The North Face and Esprit Holdings (b. 1943)
  2015   – John Trudell, American author, poet, and actor (b. 1946)
  2015   – Elsie Tu, English-Hong Kong educator and politician (b. 1913)
2016 – John Glenn, American astronaut and senator, first American to go into orbit (b. 1921)
2018 – David Weatherall, English physician, geneticist, and academic (b. 1933)
2019 – René Auberjonois, American actor (b. 1940)
  2019   – Juice Wrld, American rapper, singer and songwriter (b. 1998)
  2019   – Caroll Spinney, American puppeteer and actor (b. 1933)
2021 – Robbie Shakespeare, Jamaican bass guitarist and record producer (b. 1953)

Holidays and observances
Battle Day (Falkland Islands)
Bodhi Day (Japan)
CARICOM–Cuba Day (Caribbean Community (CARICOM) and Cuba)
Christian feast day:
Budoc (Beuzec) of Dol
Clement of Ohrid (Julian Calendar), and its related observances:
Student's Day (Bulgaria)
Eucharius
Feast of the Immaculate Conception (public holiday in several countries, a holy day of obligation in others), and its related observances:
Conception of the Blessed Virgin Mary (Anglican Communion), lesser commemoration
Festa da Conceição da Praia, celebrating Yemanjá, Queen of the Ocean in Umbanda (Salvador, Bahia)
Festival of Lights (Lyon)
Mother's Day (Panama)
Lady of Camarin Day (Guam)
Patapios of Thebes
Pope Eutychian
Richard Baxter (US Episcopal Church)
Romaric
 December 8 (Eastern Orthodox liturgics)
Constitution Day (Romania)
Constitution Day (Uzbekistan)
Day of Finnish Music (Finland)
Earliest day on which National Tree Planting Day can fall, while December 14 is the latest; celebrated on the second Monday in December. (Malawi)
Hari-Kuyō (Kansai region, Japan)
National Youth Day (Albania)
 Nations, Nationalities and Peoples' Day (Ethiopia)

References

External links

 BBC: On This Day
 
 Historical Events on December 8

Days of the year
December